Ludovico Calini (9 January 1696 Calino – 9 December 1782, Brescia) was an Italian cardinal.

Biography

Cardinal Calini was born in Calino on 9 January 1696.

He was ordained priest on 17 December 1718 and elected bishop of the diocese of Crema on 11 September 1730. Ten days later, on the 21st, he was consecrated by Cardinal Angelo Maria Quirini at the Church of San Marco, Pope Clement XIII created him a cardinal on 27 September 1766 and received the red hat and the title of Sant'Anastasia on the 30th of September of the same year.

He died on 9 December 1782 at the age of 86. At his death he was the oldest member of the College of Cardinals.

See also
 Roman Catholic Archdiocese of Benevento

Notes

References

External links
Cardinals of the Holy Roman Church

|-

|-

|-  

|-

1696 births
1782 deaths
18th-century Italian cardinals
People from Crema, Lombardy
18th-century Italian Roman Catholic bishops